General elections were held in East Germany on 17 October 1976. Out of 591 candidates of the single-list National Front for the 500-seat Volkskammer, 500 were elected from the highest number of votes received in each of the allocated lists, and 91 who lost their elections became substitute deputies. At its first session on 29 October, the Volkskammer elected Willi Stoph as Chairman of the Council of Ministers, while Erich Honecker, General Secretary of the ruling Socialist Unity Party, was elected Chairman of the Council of State. The allocation of seats remained unchanged from previous elections.

Results

References

Inter-Parliamentary Union: HISTORICAL ARCHIVE OF PARLIAMENTARY ELECTION RESULTS - Germany

1976 in East Germany
Elections in East Germany
1976 elections in Germany
October 1976 events in Europe
East Germany